The Fellowship of the Ring is the first of three volumes of the epic novel The Lord of the Rings by the English author J. R. R. Tolkien. It is followed by The Two Towers and The Return of the King. It takes place in the fictional universe of Middle-earth, and was originally published on 29 July 1954 in the United Kingdom.

The volume consists of a foreword, in which the author discusses his writing of The Lord of the Rings, a prologue titled "Concerning Hobbits, and other matters", and the main narrative in Book I and Book II.

Title and publication

Tolkien envisioned The Lord of the Rings as a single volume work divided into six sections he called "books" along with extensive appendices. The original publisher decided to split the work into three parts.

Before the decision to publish The Lord of the Rings in three volumes was made, Tolkien had hoped to publish the novel in one volume, possibly also combined with The Silmarillion. However, he had proposed titles for the individual six sections. Of the two books that comprise what became The Fellowship of the Ring the first was to be called The First Journey or The Ring Sets Out. The name of the second was The Journey of the Nine Companions or The Ring Goes South. The titles The Ring Sets Out and The Ring Goes South were used in the Millennium edition. In many other editions, the books are untitled.

Contents

The volume contains a Prologue for readers who have not read The Hobbit, and background information to set the stage for the novel.
The body of the volume consists of Book One: The Ring Sets Out, and Book Two: The Ring Goes South. Prologue 

The prologue explains that the work is "largely concerned with hobbits", telling of their origins in a migration from the east, their habits such as smoking "pipe-weed", and how their homeland the Shire is organised. It explains how the narrative follows on from The Hobbit, in which the hobbit Bilbo Baggins finds the One Ring, which had been in the possession of Gollum.

 Book I: The Ring Sets Out 

Bilbo celebrates his eleventy-first (111th) birthday and leaves the Shire suddenly, passing the Ring to Frodo Baggins, his cousin and heir. Neither hobbit is aware of the Ring's origin, but the wizard Gandalf suspects it is a Ring of Power. Seventeen years later, in "The Shadow of the Past", Gandalf tells Frodo that he has confirmed that the Ring is the one lost by the Dark Lord Sauron long ago and counsels him to take it away from the Shire. Gandalf leaves, promising to return by Frodo's birthday and accompany him on his journey, but fails to do so.

Frodo sets out on foot, offering a cover story of moving to Crickhollow, accompanied by his gardener Sam Gamgee and his cousin Pippin Took. They are pursued by mysterious Black Riders, but meet a passing group of Elves led by Gildor Inglorion, whose chants to Elbereth ward off the Riders. The hobbits spend the night with them, then take an evasive short cut the next day, and arrive at the farm of Farmer Maggot, who takes them to Bucklebury Ferry, where they meet their friend Merry Brandybuck. When they reach the house at Crickhollow, Merry and Pippin reveal they know about the Ring and insist on travelling with Frodo and Sam.

They decide to try to shake off the Black Riders by cutting through the Old Forest. Merry and Pippin are trapped by Old Man Willow, an ancient tree who controls much of the forest, but are rescued by Tom Bombadil. Leaving the refuge of Tom's house, they get lost in a fog and are caught by a barrow-wight in a barrow on the downs, but Frodo, awakening from the barrow-wight's spell, calls Tom Bombadil, who frees them, and equips them with ancient swords from the barrow-wight's hoard.

The hobbits reach the village of Bree, where they encounter a Ranger named Strider. The innkeeper gives Frodo a letter from Gandalf written three months before which identifies Strider as a friend. Knowing the riders will attempt to seize the party, Strider guides the hobbits through the wilderness toward the Elven sanctuary of Rivendell.   On the way, the group stops at the hill Weathertop. While at Weathertop, they are again attacked by five of the nine Black Riders. During the struggle, their leader wounds Frodo with a cursed blade. After fighting them off, Strider treats Frodo with the herb athelas, and is joined by the Elf Glorfindel who has been searching for the party. Glorfindel rides with Frodo, now deathly ill, toward Rivendell. The Black Riders nearly capture Frodo at the Ford of Bruinen, but upon attempting to cross the ford, flood waters summoned by Elrond rise up and overwhelm them.

 Book II: The Ring Goes South 

Frodo recovers in Rivendell under Elrond's care. Gandalf informs Frodo that the Black Riders are the Nazgûl, Men from ancient times enslaved by lesser Rings of Power to serve Sauron. The Council of Elrond discusses the history of Sauron and the Ring. Strider is revealed to be Aragorn, the heir of Isildur. Isildur had cut the One Ring from Sauron's hand in the battle ending the Second Age, but refused to destroy it, claiming it for himself. The Ring had been lost when Isildur was killed, finally ending up in Bilbo's possession after his meeting with Gollum, described in The Hobbit. Gandalf reports that the chief wizard, Saruman, has betrayed them and is now working to become a power in his own right. Gandalf was captured by him, but escaped, explaining why he had failed to return to meet Frodo as he had promised.

The Council decides that the Ring must be destroyed, but that can only be done by sending it to the fire of Mount Doom in Mordor where it was forged. Frodo takes this task upon himself. Elrond, with the advice of Gandalf, chooses companions for him. The Fellowship of the Ring consists of nine walkers who set out on the quest to destroy the One Ring, in opposition to the nine Black Riders: Frodo Baggins, Sam Gamgee, Merry Brandybuck and Pippin Took; Gandalf; the Elf Legolas; the Dwarf Gimli; and the Men Aragorn and Boromir, son of the Steward of Gondor. The Fellowship thus represents the Free Peoples of the West – Elves, Dwarves, Men, and Hobbits, assisted by a Wizard.

After a failed attempt to cross the Misty Mountains over the Redhorn Pass, the Fellowship take the perilous path through the Mines of Moria. They learn that Balin, one of the Dwarves who accompanied Bilbo in The Hobbit, and his colony of Dwarves were killed by Orcs. After surviving an attack, they are pursued by Orcs and a Balrog, an ancient fire demon from a prior Age. Gandalf confronts the Balrog, and both of them fall into the abyss of Moria. The others escape and find refuge in the timeless Elven forest of Lothlórien, where they are counselled by the Lady Galadriel.  Before they leave, Galadriel tests their loyalty, and gives them individual, magical gifts to help them on their quest. She allows Frodo and Sam to look into her fountain, the Mirror of Galadriel, to see visions of the past, the present, and perhaps the future, and she refuses to take the Ring Frodo offers her, knowing that it would master her.

Galadriel's husband Celeborn gives the Fellowship boats, elven cloaks, and waybread (Lembas), and they travel down the River Anduin to the hill of Amon Hen. There, Boromir tries to take the Ring from Frodo, but immediately regrets it after Frodo puts on the Ring and disappears. Frodo chooses to go alone to Mordor, but Sam, guessing what he intends, intercepts him as he tries to take a boat across the river, and goes with him.

Structure 

Scholars have remarked the narrative structure of the two-book volume, observing that unlike the rest of The Lord of the Rings (which has an elaborately interlaced narrative structure), all of it is told as a single thread with Frodo as the protagonist, with the exception of the two long flashback narrative chapters, "The Shadow of the Past" and "The Council of Elrond". Those two chapters combine summaries of the history of the Ring, and quoted dialogue.  Further, they are similar in having a character – Gandalf or Elrond – recapitulate the past so as to explain the present situation.

Reception 

The poet W. H. Auden wrote a positive review in The New York Times, praising the excitement and saying "Tolkien's invention is unflagging, and, on the primitive level of wanting to know what happens next, The Fellowship of the Ring is at least as good as The Thirty-Nine Steps." However, he said that the light humour in the beginning was "not Tolkien's forte". The volume was favourably reviewed by nature writer Loren Eiseley. The literary critic Edmund Wilson however wrote an unflattering review entitled "Oo, Those Awful Orcs!"
The novelist H. A. Blair, writing in the Church Quarterly Review, stated that the work told "poetic truth", appealing to "unconscious archetypes", and that it was a pre-Christian but religious book with Christian "echoes and emphasis".
The science fiction writer L. Sprague de Camp, in Science Fiction Quarterly, called it "a big, leisurely, colorful, poetical, sorrowful, adventuresome romance", and characterised the hobbits as "a cross between an English white-collar worker and a rabbit."
The Catholic reviewer Christopher Derrick wrote in The Tablet that the book was openly mythical, being a heroic romance. In his view, Tolkien displayed "amazing fertility in creating his world and almost succeeds in devising an elevated diction". 
Tolkien's friend and fellow-Inkling C. S. Lewis wrote in Time and Tide that the book created a new world of romance and "myth without allegorical pointing", with a powerful sense of history.
The novelist Naomi Mitchison praised the work in The New Statesman and Nation, stating that "above all it is a story magnificently told, with every kind of colour and movement and greatness." The Scottish poet Edwin Muir wrote in The Observer that "however one may look at it The Fellowship of the Ring is an extraordinary book", but that although Tolkien "describes a tremendous conflict between good and evil ... his good people are consistently good, his evil figures immovably evil".

Notes

References

External links

 

1954 British novels
1954 fantasy novels
Allen & Unwin books
British novels adapted into films
British novels adapted into plays
Middle-earth books
Sequel novels
The Lord of the Rings

he:שר הטבעות#אחוות הטבעת